Dr. Kkang is a 2006 South Korean television series starring Yang Dong-geun, Han Ga-in and Lee Jong-hyuk. It aired on MBC from April 5 to May 25, 2006, on Wednesdays and Thursdays at 21:55 for 16 episodes.

Plot
When a gangster (kkangpae) pretends to be a doctor in order to hide from the mob he left behind, he doesn't realize that this innocent deception will set him on the path towards love and redemption. Kang Dal-go, a mid-level member of a Busan gang, gets kicked out of the gang after being investigated by the police and is forced to flee for his life. Hiding out in Seoul, he gets hired as a doctor at a nearby hospital, where he quickly clashes with Kim Yoo-na, a dedicated and outspoken doctor. Gradually, however, the former gang member and the beautiful physician begin to fall in love in the midst of their clashes, to the dismay of prosecutor Seok Hee-jung, who is also pursuing Yoo-na. Dal-go may want to start a new life, but it's uncertain if his past will allow him to do so, and what Yoo-na's reaction will be once she discovers the truth.

Cast
Yang Dong-geun as Kang Dal-go
Han Ga-in as Dr. Kim Yoo-na
Lee Jong-hyuk as Prosecutor Seok Hee-jung
Kim Hye-ok as Yeon-ji, Dal-go's mother 
Kim Hak-chul as Song Kwang-ho, Shark Fin gang boss
Kim Jung-tae as Jo Jang-shik, Shark Fin gangster
Park Si-eun as Lee Hye-young, Yoo-na's sister-in-law
Ha Seok-jin as Kim Jin-gyu, Yoo-na's brother
Oh Kwang-rok as Dr. Bong
Jo Mi-ryung as Nurse Seo
Choi Jae-won as Detective Kim, Yoo-na's brother and Hye-young's husband
Jung Gyu-woon as Detective Bae
Yoo Tae-sung as Taek-soo
Kim Soo-kyum as Soon-ae
Kim Ha-kyun as Prosecutor Hwang
Kim Chul-ki as Do Jin-shik, Dal-go's lawyer
Won Tae-hee as a junior high school student
Choi Beom-ho

References

External links
 Dr. Kkang official MBC website 
 Dr. Gang at MBC Global Media
 
 

2006 South Korean television series debuts
2006 South Korean television series endings
MBC TV television dramas
South Korean romance television series
Television series by IHQ (company)